Sometimes Like This I Talk is the second studio album by tenor saxophonist Steve Mackay. It was released on February 22, 2011, on Radon. Most of the songs on the album were done with Stooges bassist Mike Watt. The lead single, "The Prisoner", features lead vocals sung by Iggy Pop, credited on the CD liner notes as Ypsi Jim.

Track listing
"Sometimes Like This I Talk"
"Dead Chevys"
"Expatriate"
"The Vacuum Does Exist"
"Song for Baghdad"
"Rue Interdit D'Afficher"
"The Prisoner"
"Rua Afixação Proibida"
"Lament For the Leaving of the Isle of Lewis"
"Lost in the Fog"
"Kristallnacht"
"Zombie Chevys"
"Stradivarius' Cat"

References

External links
 Sometimes Like This I Talk at allmusic.com

2011 albums